Terrell is a city in Kaufman County, Texas, United States. As of the 2020 census, its population was 17,465.

History
Terrell developed as a railroad town, beginning in 1873 with construction of the Texas and Pacific Railroad line. The town was named for Robert A. Terrell, a pioneer European-American settler whose farm lay on its western edge. He built an octagonal house on his property, called "Round  House", to provide better defense against attacks by Native Americans. They had occupied this territory for thousands of years. His house was later fitted with the first glass windows in the county. The community was incorporated in 1875. The first automobile appeared in 1899.

In 1892, Terrell was a sundown town that largely prohibited African Americans from living there.

The Terrell Military College was established in Terrell, operating until after World War II. Its campus was sited on part of the former Terrell farm and incorporated his historic Round House. In 1949, the Southern Bible Institute, based in Dallas and affiliated with the Churches of Christ, bought the military college property and transferred their operations here, renaming their institution Southwestern Christian College. It is a private, historically black college. The Round House has been preserved on campus, and is one of 20 such structures in the nation.

The headquarters of the 3rd Battalion, 144th Infantry Regiment of the Texas Army National Guard was also located in Terrell.

Geography

Terrell is located in northern Kaufman County at  (32.737525, –96.282444). U.S. Route 80 passes through the city center, leading west to Dallas and east  to Wills Point. Interstate 20 passes through the south side of the city, leading west  to Interstate 635 in the southeast suburbs of Dallas (Balch Springs) and east  to Canton. Texas State Highway 34 passes through the east side of Terrell, leading northeast  to Greenville and south  to Kaufman, the county seat.

Climate

The climate in this area is characterized by hot, humid summers and generally mild to cool winters. According to the Köppen climate classification, Terrell has a humid subtropical climate, Cfa on climate maps.

Demographics

As of the 2020 United States census, 17,465 people, 6,023 households, and 4,111 families resided in the city.

Arts and culture

British Flying Training School
During World War II, the No. 1 British Flying Training School was located in Terrell. It was the first of six civilian flight schools in the United States dedicated to instructing British Royal Air Force (RAF) pilots during that war. This followed an international training concept similar to that previously implemented during World War I near Fort Worth at Camp Taliaferro.

Terrell Municipal Airport hosts the No. 1 British Flying Training School Museum, which has an extensive record of the school. In 2000, the museum was instrumental in honoring four RAF airmen who died in a crash during World War II. The four, flying from Terrell, encountered difficulties over the Kiamichi Mountains of Oklahoma. The AT6 Monument, whose dedication made international headlines with many from Terrell and the United Kingdom present, marks the spot of one of the crashes. City, state, and even international dignitaries gathered in Terrell on Friday, September 16, 2011, to mark the opening of the new Major William F. Long Terminal Building.

World War II veterans reunion
The City of Terrell, in partnership with the No. 1 British Flying Training School Museum, hosts an annual World War II veterans' reunion and air event on the first Saturday of October. This event draws attendees from all over the world. It presents numerous attractions such as vintage aircraft and military vehicles, skydiving, flight simulators, lectures, films, demonstrations, and activities for every member of the family. The reunion dinner and hangar dance are on Friday night, and the fly-in kicks off with a pancake breakfast on Saturday morning, followed by a ceremony and entertainment until the afternoon.

Terrell Jubilee
Terrell Jubilee, held the third weekend in April at Ben Gill Park, is a family celebration with a BBQ cook-off, museum tours, arts and crafts exhibition, carnival, live music, a quilt show, an auto show, and other attractions.

Education

Public school

The city is zoned to schools in Terrell Independent School District.
 Terrell High School (Grades 9–12)
 Herman Furlough, Jr. Middle School (Grades 6–8)
 Dr. Bruce Wood Intermediate School (Grades K–5) Serving the West Side of Terrell
 J.W. Long Elementary School (Grades K–5) Serving the East Side of Terrell
 Gilbert Willie Sr. Elementary School (Grades K–5)
 W.H. Burnett Early Childhood Center (Serving three- and four-year olds)
In 2010, Terrell Independent School District voted to rezone the district into East and West for grades 3–6. The city is divided along Rockwall St. and then further down along a line with no specific boundary.

Colleges

Trinity Valley Community College operates the Kaufman County Campus in Terrell.

Southwestern Christian College is a private, historically black college affiliated with the Churches of Christ. It offers a four-year degree for ministerial studies, and two-year associate degrees in liberal arts and technical specialties.

Infrastructure

Health care
Terrell is the location of the Terrell State Hospital, a psychiatric inpatient hospital with 316 beds operated under the direction of the Texas Department of State Health Services.

Notable people
 Harry Ables, baseball player
 Betty Brown, politician
 Louis Conradt, attorney 
 Robert H. Dennard, electrical engineer who invented DRAM and identified MOSFET scaling law (known as Dennard scaling)
 Jamie Foxx, two-time Grammy Award-winning musician and singer, and Academy Award-winning actor
 Lance Gooden, Lance Carter Gooden, elected 2019 to House of Representatives of the United States Congress
 Jimmy Harris, football defensive back and quarterback
 Kenoy Kennedy, football safety
 Brice McCain, football cornerback
 Laci Mosley, actress 
 Cynthea Rhodes, a member of the USA track & field team in the 1996 Summer Olympics in Atlanta
 Randy Snow, tennis player
 C. J. Wilson, American football cornerback for the Tampa Bay Buccaneers, Chicago Bears, and NC State

References

External links
 Official website
 Terrell Chamber of Commerce
 Texas State Historical Association
 The Terrell Tribune
 75160, community blog
 Terrell Daily Photo Blog
 Terrell Texas Daily Photo Blog

Dallas–Fort Worth metroplex
Cities in Kaufman County, Texas
Cities in Texas
Populated places established in 1874
1874 establishments in Texas
Sundown towns in Texas